Porto Dubai is a residential development under construction off the coast, near the Umm Suqeim marina in Jumeirah on an artificial self-reclaimed island.
The development endows luxury villas, restaurants, a spa, and a health club. The estimated cost of Porto Dubai is AED 2.1 billion. The reclamation work on porto dubai has been completed including 1 million square metres of sand and rock.  The villas will be arranged in a circular pattern on the peninsula's four platforms. However, construction was halted in 2010.

See also
Jumeirah Garden City
List of development projects in Dubai

References

External links
Official website
Ameinfo.com
Gulfnews.com
Fedtec.net
Gsifz.ae

Buildings and structures under construction in Dubai